Robert Doud "Bob" Martin (June 19, 1925 – October 18, 2012) was an American rower who competed in the 1948 Summer Olympics. He was born in Tacoma, Washington and died in Gig Harbor, Washington.

In 1948 he was a crew member of the American boat which won the gold medal in the coxed fours event.

External links
 
 
 The Pocock Generation Part I
 The Pocock Generation Part II
 The Pocock Generation Part III
 Bob Martin's obituary

1925 births
2012 deaths
Rowers at the 1948 Summer Olympics
Olympic gold medalists for the United States in rowing
American male rowers
Medalists at the 1948 Summer Olympics